Lawrence English (born 1975/76) is an Australian composer, artist, and curator from Brisbane. His work is broadly concerned with the politics of perception, specifically he is interested in the nature of listening, and sounds' capability to occupy the body. He is the director of the imprint Room40, started in 2000. He and Jamie Stewart from Xiu Xiu have an ongoing collaboration named Hexa.

Sound works 
English's music is recognised as exploring "environmental and musical sources and is highly regarded for its intelligent invocation of perception, memory and space". On his 2014 album Wilderness of Mirrors he outlines his approach to composition "For me it's about a kind of struggle between almost nothing and almost everything. Sometimes one sound can be too much and other times 50 layers seems lacking in the depth you want to convey. I think at the heart of this question is dynamics, and I feel that's very much what this album is about. It's a slow reveal, I want it to be a seduction."

He cites childhood experiences birdwatching for reed warbler with his father as the starting point for his interest in sound in space. He has stated, "If you just looked in the reeds you'd see nothing. If you listened you got an idea of space and a sense of where it might be, then you understood it. That's probably my first experience with these ideas of space and sound, which are basically the fundamental building blocks of what I've been interested in since then." These experiences have led to a long engagement with field recordings, and more recently the development of theoretical approaches to the practice including his Relational Listening theory.

Discography

Studio albums

Awards

Queensland Music Awards
The Queensland Music Awards (previously known as Q Song Awards) are annual awards celebrating Queensland, Australia's brightest emerging artists and established legends. They commenced in 2006.

 (wins only)
|-
| 2008
| "Watching It Unfold"
| Electronic song of the Year 
| 
|-

References

External links 

 

1976 births
20th-century Australian engineers
20th-century Australian male artists
21st-century Australian engineers
21st-century Australian male artists
Australian audio engineers
Australian curators
Australian male artists
Australian male composers
Australian sound artists
Birdwatchers
Indie musicians
Living people
Mass media theorists
Music theorists
People from Brisbane
Queensland University of Technology alumni
Sound recordists
Wildlife sound recordists